Laramie Regional Airport  is three miles west of Laramie, in Albany County, Wyoming. It is owned by the Laramie Regional Airport Board. Airline service is subsidized by the Essential Air Service program.

Federal Aviation Administration records say the airport had 10,371 passenger boardings (enplanements) in calendar year 2008, 8,663 enplanements in 2009, and 8,999 in 2010. The National Plan of Integrated Airport Systems for 2011–2015 categorized it as a primary commercial service airport based on enplanements in 2008 (more than 10,000 per year).

The area has many businesses and the University of Wyoming and the Wyoming Technical Institute.  The airport has airline flights to Denver, Colorado, but these are less than one percent of all flights. The airport has an important fire fighting role.

History 
Built in 1934, the airport was Brees Field until 1992, after United States Army general Herbert J. Brees. To allow B-24 Bombers the runways were paved in 1944. Airline flights started in 1945; in 1959 the terminal building was built.

Facilities

The airport covers 1,580 acres (639 ha) at an elevation of 7,284 feet (2,220 m). It has two asphalt runways: 3/21 is 8,502 by 150 feet (2,591 x 46 m) and 12/30 is 6,300 by 100 feet (1,920 x 30 m).

In 2018 the airport had 10,486 aircraft operations, an average of 29 per day: 81% general aviation, 14% air taxi, <1% airline, and 5% military. 38 aircraft were then based at this airport: 76% single-engine and 24% multi-engine.

Airline and destination 

As of March 2016 only Skywest flies into Laramie on behalf of United Express. Normally a Bombardier CRJ-200 regional jet is operated on flights from Denver.

Statistics

Top destinations

References

Other sources 

 Essential Air Service documents (Docket OST-1997-2958) from the U.S. Department of Transportation:
 Order 2000-5-14 (May 11, 2000): tentatively reselecting Great Lakes Aviation to provide essential air service at Laramie, Rock Springs and Worland, Wyoming, for the two-year period from May 1, 2000 – April 30, 2002, at an annual subsidies of $297,633, for Laramie, $465,023, for Rock Springs, and $353,345 for Worland.
 Order 2002-7-20 (July 11, 2002): extends the interim subsidy rates of Great Lakes Aviation, Ltd. at each of the communities listed (Page, AZ; Alamosa, CO; Pueblo, CO; Ironwood, MI/Ashland, WI; McCook, NE; Laramie, WY; Rock Springs, WY; Worland, WY; Moab, UT; Vernal, UT).
 Order 2004-7-16 (July 20, 2004): selects Great Lakes Aviation, Ltd., to provide essential air service with 19-passenger B1900D aircraft at Laramie, Riverton, Rock Springs, and Worland, Wyoming, for two years for annual subsidy rates of $397,400, $394,046, $390,488, and $797,844, respectively.
 Order 2006-9-9 (September 11, 2006): re-selecting Great Lakes Aviation, Ltd., operating as both a United Airlines and Frontier code-share partner, to provide subsidized essential air service (EAS) at Laramie and Worland, Wyoming, at an annual subsidy rate of $487,516 for Laramie and $972,757 for Worland, for the two-year period of October 1, 2006, through September 30, 2008.
 Order 2008-7-3 (July 1, 2008): re-selecting Great Lakes Aviation, Ltd., operating as both a United Airlines and Frontier Airlines code-share partner, to provide subsidized essential air service (EAS) at Laramie and Worland, Wyoming, at an annual subsidy rate of $1,215,603 for Laramie and $1,735,814 for Worland, for the two-year period of October 1, 2008, through September 30, 2010.
 Order 2010-8-10 (August 18, 2010): selecting Great Lakes Aviation, Ltd., operating as both a United Airlines and Frontier Airlines code share partner, to provide essential air service (EAS) at Laramie and Worland, for a combined annual subsidy of $2,951,908, for the two-year period from October 1, 2010, to September 30, 2012.

External links 

 Aerial image as of August 1994 from USGS The National Map
 
 

Airports in Wyoming
Essential Air Service
Laramie, Wyoming
Buildings and structures in Albany County, Wyoming
Transportation in Albany County, Wyoming